European Film Academy Young Audience Award has been awarded annually since 2012 by the European Film Academy. EFA presents three European films to 12-14-year-old audiences across Europe.

Winners and nominees

2010s

2020s

References

External links
 Nominees and winners at the European Film Academy website

Young Audience
Awards established in 2012
2012 establishments in Europe
Audience awards